"Husbands and Wives" is a song written and first recorded by American country music singer Roger Miller. Miller's original, from his album Words and Music, was released in February 1966 and was a crossover hit for him, reaching Top Ten on the U.S. country and Adult Contemporary charts, as well as Top 40 on the pop charts. Since the release of Miller's original, the song has been covered by several other artists, including The Everly Brothers, Ringo Starr, Neil Diamond, a duet between David Frizzell and Shelly West, Jules Shear, and Brooks & Dunn, whose version was a number-one country hit in 1998.

Content
"Husbands and Wives" is a mid-tempo waltz in the key of C major. In it, the narrator makes observations on a couple who is breaking up ("Two broken hearts, lonely, looking like houses / Where nobody lives"). He then suggests that the relationship is strained because those involved have too much pride in themselves ("It's my belief pride is the chief cause in the decline / In the number of husbands and wives").

Roger Miller version
Roger Miller recorded the song in 1966 for his album Words and Music, releasing it as the album's first single. It was a crossover hit for him, reaching Top 5 on the country and Adult Contemporary charts, as well as Top 40 on the Billboard Hot 100. Its b-side, "I've Been a Long Time Leavin' (But I'll Be a Long Time Gone)," peaked at #13 on the country charts.

Wayne Newton cover
Wayne Newton recorded "Husbands and Wives" in 1968. It was a minor hit for him, reaching #28 on the U.S. Adult Contemporary chart, as well as #97 on Cash Box.

Chart history
Peter Lotis

Roger Miller

Wayne Newton

David Frizzell and Shelly West version

David Frizzell and Shelly West covered the song on their 1981 duets album Carryin' On the Family Names, and released it as the album's third and final single. Their version reached the Top 20 on the country singles chart.

Chart history

Brooks & Dunn version

Country music duo Brooks & Dunn covered the song on their 1998 album If You See Her. Featuring lead vocals from Ronnie Dunn, their version was the album's third single, reaching the top of the country singles chart in December 1998. It was also their first Top 40 hit on the pop charts, peaking at No. 36 on the Billboard Hot 100.

Chart history
"Husbands and Wives" debuted at number 64 on the U.S. Billboard Hot Country Singles & Tracks chart for the week of September 26, 1998.

Year-end charts

References

1966 songs
1966 singles
1981 singles
1998 singles
Number-one singles in South Africa
Roger Miller songs
David Frizzell songs
Shelly West songs
Brooks & Dunn songs
Male–female vocal duets
Songs written by Roger Miller
Song recordings produced by Don Cook
Song recordings produced by Snuff Garrett
Warner Records singles
Arista Nashville singles
Smash Records singles
Song recordings produced by Jerry Kennedy
Songs about marriage